Jacmel is an arrondissement in the Sud-Est department of Haiti. As of 2015, the population was 338,728 inhabitants.

Postal codes in the Jacmel Arrondissement start with the number 91.

The arrondissement consists of the following communes:
 Jacmel
 Cayes-Jacmel
 La Vallée
 Marigot

History

2010 7.0 earthquake

Recovery 
In December 2010, the Capponi Construction Group, a Miami-based construction company decided to help with the revitalization of a  Jacmel. This initiative was created to help stimulate a self-sustained tourism economy for Haiti. Michael Capponi, founder of the Capponi Group, formed the Jacmel Advisory Council to help revitalize Jacmel, while preserving its arts, culture and traditions. The board promotes best practices to provide a socio-economic system for thousands of Haitians living in the south east region. Capponi Group Haiti is also restoring a 200-year-old coffee sorting house on the port of Jacmel.

Jacmel, a city with many French colonial heritage buildings, was devastated by a 7.0 magnitude tremblor on 12 January 2010, collapsing much of its heritage architecture.

Facilities
The largest health centre/hospital in the region is Saint-Michel in Jacmel. It was severely damaged in the 12 January 2010 quake.

References

Arrondissements of Haiti
Sud-Est (department)